Greystoke: The Legend of Tarzan, Lord of the Apes is a 1984 adventure film directed by Hugh Hudson based on Edgar Rice Burroughs' novel Tarzan of the Apes (1912). Christopher Lambert stars as Tarzan (though the name Tarzan is never used in the film's dialogue) and Andie MacDowell as Jane; the cast also includes Ralph Richardson (in his final role), Ian Holm, James Fox, Cheryl Campbell, and Ian Charleson.

Greystoke received three Oscar nominations at the 57th Academy Awards ceremony for Best Actor in a Supporting Role for Richardson, Best Writing, Screenplay Based on Material from Another Medium, and Best Makeup. It became the first Tarzan feature film to be nominated for an Academy Award; the later Disney animated feature film adaptation became the first one to win an Oscar.

Plot 
John, Lord Clayton, the heir to the 6th Earl of Greystoke, and his pregnant wife Alice are shipwrecked on the African coast. John builds a home in the trees, and Alice gives birth to a son. Alice later grows ill from malaria and dies. While John is grieving her, the tree house is visited by curious apes, one of whom kills him. One female of the group, Kala, who is carrying her dead infant, hears the cries of the infant human in his crib. She adopts the boy and raises him as a member of the Mangani.

At age one, the boy learns gorilla talk and learns how to walk. At age five, the boy learns how to swing a vine and is still trying to fit in with his ape family. When a Black panther attacks, he learns how to swim to evade it while another ape is killed.

At age 12, the boy discovers the treehouse in which he lived as a baby with his real mother and father. He finds a wooden block, with pictures of both a boy and a chimpanzee painted on it. He sees himself in a mirror and recognizes the physical differences between himself and the rest of his ape family. He also discovers his father's hunting knife and how it works. The objects fascinate the boy, and he takes them with him; but is ambushed by a scarred old ape who savagely beats him before the boy's ape mother and father arrive. The boy is nursed back to health and antagonizes the old ape, learning to evade the stronger opponent than fight him directly. One day his mother is killed by a native hunting party, and he kills one of them in revenge.

Years later, Belgian explorer Phillippe d'Arnot is traveling with a band of British adventurers along the river. He is disgusted by their boorish nature and love of "blood and sport". A band of natives attacks the party, killing everyone except Phillippe, who is injured and conceals himself in the trees. The young man finds Phillippe and nurses him back to health. D'Arnot discovers that the man is a natural mimic and teaches him to speak rudimentary English. D'Arnot deduces that this man is the son of the late Lord John and Lady Alice of Greystoke and calls the man "Jean". Jean agrees to return to England with his benefactor and reunite with his human family.

On arrival at Greystoke, the family's country estate in the Lowlands of Scotland, John is welcomed by his grandfather, the 6th Earl of Greystoke, and his ward, a young American woman called Jane. The Earl still grieves the loss of his son and daughter-in-law years earlier but is very happy to have his grandson home. He displays eccentric behaviour and often confuses John with John's father.

John is treated as a novelty by the local social set, and some of his behavior is seen as threatening and savage. He befriends a young mentally disabled worker on the estate and in his company relaxes into his natural ape-like behaviour. Jane meanwhile teaches John more English, French, and social skills. They become very close and one evening passionately make love in secret.

Lord Greystoke enjoys renewed vigour at the return of his grandson and, reminiscing about his childhood game of using a silver tray as a toboggan on a flight of stairs in the grand house, decides to relive the old pastime. He crashes at the foot of the stairs and slowly dies, apparently from a head injury, in the arms of his grandson. At his passing, John displays similar emotions and a lack of understanding about death as he did in Africa following the death of Kala.

John inherits the title Earl of Greystoke. Jane helps John through his grief, and they become engaged. He is also cheered up when his mentor, Phillippe, returns. One day he visits the Natural History Museum in London with Jane. During their visit, John is disturbed by the displays of stuffed animals. He discovers many live, caged apes from Africa, including his adoptive father, Silverbeard. They recognise each other, and John releases Silverbeard and other caged animals. They are pursued by police and museum officials. They reach a woodland park, where Silverbeard is fatally shot. John, devastated, yells to the crowd, "He was my father!"

Unable to assimilate to the human society that he views as cruel, John decides to return to Africa and reunite with his ape family. Phillippe and Jane escort him back to the jungle where Phillippe and John first met. John returns to the world he understands and is reunited with his ape friend, Figs. Jane does not join him, but Phillippe silently expresses his hope that perhaps they may someday be reunited.

Cast 

 Christopher Lambert – John Clayton/Tarzan, Lord of the Apes, a man orphaned in the jungle who was adopted by a group of apes and became their leader and is the last member of the Greystoke lineage
 Tali McGregor – Infant Tarzan
 Peter Kyriakou – One-year-old Tarzan
 Danny Potts – Five-year-old Tarzan
 Eric Langlois – Twelve-Year-Old Tarzan
 Ralph Richardson – The 6th Earl of Greystoke, John Clayton's grandfather who is the current Earl of Greystoke and confuses John for his son due to grief and his deteriorated memory
 Ian Holm – Capitaine Phillippe d'Arnot, a Belgian explorer who discovered John in the jungle, taught him the way of man, and brought him to England
 James Fox – Lord Charles Esker, a lord who tries to keep the line of Greystoke intact
 Andie MacDowell – Jane Porter, the Earl's ward who becomes romantically involved with John
 Glenn Close – Jane Porter (voice, uncredited). Close later voiced Kala, Tarzan's adoptive ape mother in the Disney animated adaptation.
 Cheryl Campbell – Alice, Lady Clayton of Greystoke, John's biological mother who dies of malaria
 Paul Geoffrey – John "Jack" Clayton, Viscount Clayton, John's biological father who is killed by his adoptive ape father
 Ian Charleson – Jeffson Brown
 Nigel Davenport – Major Jack Downing
 Nicholas Farrell – Sir Hugh Belcher
 Richard Griffiths – Captain Billings
 Hilton McRae – Willy
 David Suchet – Buller
 John Wells – Sir Evelyn Blount
 Paul Brooke – The Rev. Stimson

Ape performers 

 Peter Elliott as Silverbeard, the dominant male of the Mangani troop and John's adoptive ape father. Elliott was also the ape movement choreographer.
 Ailsa Berk – Kala, John's adoptive ape mother who took him in after she lost her infant
 John Alexander – White Eyes, an aggressive male in the troop who has a strong hatred for John
 Christopher Beck – Droopy Ears, a childhood friend of John who was unfortunately killed by a black panther
 Mak Wilson – Figs, an overweight member of the troop who is a faithful follower of John
 Emil Abossolo-Mbo and Deep Roy – additional ape performers

Development

Robert Towne 
In August 1974 producer Stanley Jaffe announced Warner Bros had bought the rights to the Tarzan character from the Burroughs estate and wanted to make a new Tarzan film. "It won't be a caricature or a popularization", he said. "It will be a serious period action adventure true to the characters and done in terms of contemporary mores." Robert Towne signed to write the script. No director or cast was attached but the producer said "I expect the Tarzan we'll cast won't be a muscle man."

Towne later recalled, "I called up a friend and said, "Let's do it." But he says, "Oh, damn man, that's going to be a problem"—because an associate of his had met resistance trying to put together a Tarzan film. Oh, no, come on—Jane Goodall, Shadow of Man. We could actually do it now as if it really happened. And my friend said "You’re right, screw it, let's do it"."

In September 1975 a report said the film would be made the following year. "It's a very heavy story", said Towne. "Very sensual. Basically it's about Tarzan and his foster mother." The film had a tentative budget of $6 million and a working title of Lord Greystoke.

Towne said working on the script is what made him want to direct. "I suddenly realized that I'd written a bunch of descriptions without much dialogue to go along with it", he said. "I'd reached the age where I realized that I couldn't necessarily just turn that over to a director and say "Don't fuck it up." It's just a bunch of descriptions, and then it became embarrassingly apparent to me that those were what I saw when I wrote them down. There was nobody else who could see them, so I needed to direct... The distance between the page and the stage is so enormous that it is unbelievable how even the brightest people can misread your intent or not see it altogether. Scripts have air in them. Scripts are supposed to leave things up to interpretation, but people can misread things enormously, so sometimes it's just a matter of wanting to put on the screen what you had in mind."

By October 1977 Towne was attached as director as well as writer. Anthea Sylbert was appointed Warners executive in charge of the project.

Towne made his directorial debut on another project he had written, Personal Best. This movie, about female athletes, came out of Towne's interest in human movement, which arose from his research into Greystoke. He intended Personal Best to be a "trial run" for Greystoke. However filming Personal Best proved extremely difficult – Towne had to deal with an actors strike and a budget blow out. He wound up in conflict with producer David Geffen and Warners that led to him selling his interest in Greystoke.

"Greystoke may be the kid I love the most, but I was eight months' pregnant with Personal Best, so that's the kid I had to save", said Towne.  Part of the $1 million that Towne received for Greystoke was put in escrow to be held against any money he went over budget on Personal Best. Towne later said he was practically broke. "Nobody can believe how mucked up financially you can be by these studio guys. But a cab driver in New York who doesn't get tipped gets more sympathy than any Hollywood writer." Personal Best was a box office flop.

In 2010 Towne said losing Greystoke was "then, is now, and always will be the biggest creative regret of my life."

Hugh Hudson 
A new director became attached to the project – Hugh Hudson whose debut feature Chariots of Fire had been a surprise box office hit.  "Towne's script was brilliant", said Hudson. "It was only half finished and overlong but all the jungle stuff was there and it was fascinating. I said yes at once."

Hudson was going to make the film with his Chariots producer, David Puttnam. Makeup artist Rick Baker signed to create the ape makeup.

Puttnam eventually pulled out and went off to produce Local Hero instead. "After looking into it carefully I felt it needed a more experienced producer", he said. "I've never worked with special effects and frankly they terrify me. And on that film you need someone who's done that. I'd have been learning on the job and that could have proved expensive and one of the things I rely on is people's belief that I can deliver good value for money. I had this awful vision of Greystoke going over budget and my whole reputation going down the drain."

Hudson said, "I think he [Puttnam] felt he had lost control because it was a studio picture set up by Semel and Daly and they wanted to deal directly with me, and he had this other film going, The Killing Fields, that he probably wanted to do more. Stanley Canter [who's credited as producer alongside Hudson] had a deal with Warners and the Edgar Rice Burroughs estate, but he wasn’t involved in the making of the film."

Hudson had the script revived by Michael Austin. They spent nine months on it.

Hudson said the film was "about Adam and Eve, the Garden of Eden. It's about the loss of innocence and about the evolutionary urge. This boy is discovered by a Belgian, d'Arnot, and he's taught language. Up to that point he's very contented, but d'Arnot is the snake in the myth. He gives him the word, and from that point you could say he's lost. The question is, does he have to go on to join society, or not? The story asks you to consider how society lives, halfway between the apes and the angels, aspiring to go up yet coming from down there. It's about the battle of nature and nurture, nature and culture – a dilemma, a terrible dichotomy in us all. It's about the freedom of the jungle and the distortions and strictures of society, and how perhaps we can't do without either of them. There's not enough nature in society, and maybe not enough society in nature. The thing is about that sort of balance, which is so tender, so difficult to achieve, yet so essential to all of us. It's about two opposing forces, which shouldn't be opposing at all."

Towne had done tests involving real apes but Hudson felt this was too difficult and decided to use humans in ape costumes.

Production

Casting 
Hudson wanted to cast unknowns as Tarzan and Jane. "They are complete innocents, and therefore somebody new is more acceptable to the audience than a face you know. They also represent the innocent side of ourselves, and we should be able to identify with them. So Tarzan is what we might be, if we had lived like that: light, lithe, every muscle used, but not rippling like a Charles Atlas."

Hudson tested four people as Tarzan: a Danish ballet dancer, Julian Sands, Viggo Mortensen and Christopher Lambert. Hudson said it came down to Lambert and Mortensen. "I just felt that Christopher was the right person. He had this strange quality — somehow, because he was myopic, when he took his glasses off, he couldn’t really see properly so he would seem to look through you into the distance."

Andie MacDowell made her film debut as Jane. "The camera loves her, and I just felt she was the right person", said Hudson. "Of course it's a risk, but then the whole project is a risk. If I'm a good director I'll get the performance I want out of her."

Preparation 
Hudson used Dr. Earl Hopper, the American author of Social Mobility, as an adviser on the film's psychological and social plausibility. He also used Professor Roger Fouts of the Central Washington University, a primatologist who has successfully instructed chimpanzees in sign language for the deaf.

"Tarzan is everyman, and he is also everyman's idealized projection of himself", said Hudson. "We all aspire to be how he is, morally and physically. We'd all love to have that body, be wild, swing in the trees, and get the ideal woman, who is Jane. And all that, all that meaning, is dressed up in a terrific 'Boys Own' story, a marvelously exciting adventure yarn." In preparation for the movie, Christopher Lambert trained with real apes and said " I wasn't afraid of them, but you must show them respect."

Shooting 

Filming started in November 1982.

The film was shot in Korup National Park in western Cameroon and in Scotland. Several great houses in the UK were used for the Greystoke family seat:
 Floors Castle near Kelso in Roxburghshire, Scotland, is used for the exterior and ballroom scenes,
 Hatfield House in Hertfordshire (entrance hall, grand staircase),
 Blenheim Palace in Oxfordshire.

Greystoke was the first Hollywood film to be shot in the Super Techniscope format.

Post-production 
The dialogue of Andie MacDowell, who played Jane, was dubbed in post-production by Glenn Close. According to Hugh Hudson, this was due to MacDowell's southern US accent, which he did not want for the film, and that she was not (at the time) a trained actor. The young Jane featured at the beginning of the film is portrayed as American, which is consistent with Burroughs' story.

Sir Ralph Richardson, who played The 6th Earl of Greystoke, died shortly after filming ended, and he received a posthumous Oscar nomination for Best Supporting Actor. The film was dedicated to his memory.

Warners cut out 25 minutes from the jungle footage of Tarzan growing up. "I was sorry to lose those scenes", said Hudson. "But you can't have everything."

Vangelis was going to do the music, but according to Hudson, he got "writer's block", so they got John Scott, "and he did a very good job in a very short space of time", said the director.

When the film finished, Hudson said that the result was "70%" of the film that he wanted to make.

Relationship with other Tarzan stories 

In a departure from most previous Tarzan films, Greystoke returned to Burroughs' original novel for many elements of its plot. It also utilized a number of corrective ideas first put forth by science fiction author Philip José Farmer in his mock-biography Tarzan Alive, most notably Farmer's explanation of how the speech-deprived ape-man was later able to acquire language by showing Tarzan to be a natural mimic. According to Burroughs' original concept, the apes who raised Tarzan actually had a rudimentary vocal language, and this is portrayed in the film.

Greystoke rejected the common film portrayal of Tarzan as a simpleton that was established by Johnny Weissmuller's 1930s renditions, reasserting Burroughs' characterisation of an articulate and intelligent human being, not unlike the so-called "new look" films that Sy Weintraub produced in the 1960s. The second half of the film departs radically from Burroughs' original story. Tarzan is discovered and brought to Scotland, where he fails to adapt to civilization. His return to the wild (having already succeeded his grandfather as Lord Greystoke) is portrayed as a matter of necessity rather than choice, and he is separated, apparently, forever from Jane, who "could not have survived" in his world. In his book Harlan Ellison's Watching, Harlan Ellison explains that the film's promotion as "the definitive version" of the Tarzan legend is misleading. He details production and scripting failures which in his opinion contribute to the film's inaccuracy.

Reception

Box office 
The film grossed $45.9 million upon its release, making it the 15th most popular film at the box office in 1984.

Critical reception 
Colin Greenland reviewed Greystoke for Imagine magazine, and stated that "If there's a better film this year than Greystoke, I shall be astonished."

Awards

Won 
 British Academy Film Awards Best Makeup and Hair  – Paul Engelen, Peter Frampton, Rick Baker, Joan Hills
 British Film Institute Technical Achievement Award
 New York Film Critics Circle Awards Best Supporting Actor  – Ralph Richardson

Nominated
 Academy Award for Best Supporting Actor – Ralph Richardson
 Academy Award for Best Adapted Screenplay – Robert Towne, Michael Austin
 Academy Award for Best Makeup – Rick Baker, Paul Engelen
 Academy of Science Fiction, Fantasy and Horror Films (Best Fantasy Film)
 Academy of Science Fiction, Fantasy and Horror Films (Best Costumes) – John Mollo
 British Academy Film Award for Best Supporting Actor – Ian Holm
 British Academy Film Award for Best Supporting Actor – Ralph Richardson
 British Academy Film Award for Best Sound – Ivan Sharrock, Gordon K. McCallum, Les Wiggins, Roy Baker
 Writers Guild of America Awardfor Best Screenplay Based on Material from Another Medium – Robert Towne, Michael Austin

References

External links 
 
 
 
 
 

1984 films
1980s adventure drama films
1980s fantasy adventure films
American adventure drama films
American fantasy adventure films
British adventure drama films
British fantasy adventure films
Films shot at EMI-Elstree Studios
Films directed by Hugh Hudson
Films set in the 1880s
Films set in 1885
Films set in 1886
Films set in 1887
Films set in the 1890s
Films set in 1891
Films set in 1898
Films set in the 1900s
Films set in 1906
Films set in Africa
Films set in Scotland
Films shot in Cameroon
Films shot in Hertfordshire
Films shot in Oxfordshire
Films shot in the Scottish Borders
Films with screenplays by Robert Towne
Films scored by John Scott (composer)
Tarzan films
Warner Bros. films
1984 drama films
1980s English-language films
1980s American films
1980s British films